Questing is a  open space preserve and colonial era historic site located in New Marlborough, Massachusetts within The Berkshires. The property, acquired in 1996 by the land conservation non-profit organization The Trustees of Reservations, is named for a mythical beast from Arthurian Mythology called the Questing Beast.

The reservation includes hiking trails, open meadows and hay fields, vernal pools, and streams. It is open to hiking, picnicking, cross country skiing, and hunting (in season). A trailhead is located on New Marlborough Hill Road in New Marlborough.  Bikes, snowmobiles and motorized vehicles are prohibited.

History
Questing Reservation is on a hill where the first fort was built in the original New Marlborough settlement, and where the first non-Native American children were born, the Brookins twins. The precise location of this site is no longer known. Later this site was also the location of the settlement of the Leffingwell family, abandoned in the Great Depression. The only remains of the Leffingwell farmstead are cellar holes and stone walls.

The property was acquired in 1992 and 1996 through land gifts by Robert A. Lehman and Richard W. Sellew.

References

External links
Questing The Trustees of Reservations]
Questing trail map

Protected areas of Berkshire County, Massachusetts
The Trustees of Reservations
Open space reserves of Massachusetts
Ghost towns in Massachusetts
New Marlborough, Massachusetts
1996 establishments in Massachusetts
Protected areas established in 1996